Raymond Joseph Lucia, Sr. is an American former Certified Financial Planner, former Registered Investment Advisor, author, radio personality and television host. He is host of The Ray Lucia Show, a nationally syndicated radio and television financial talk show on the Business Talk Radio Network and the Biz Television network.

On July 8, 2013, The United States Securities and Exchange Commission (SEC) banned him from associating with an investment adviser, broker or dealer, revoked his license and that of his former company, and slapped both with a fine -- $50,000 to Lucia and $250,000 to his former firm.

Early life, education, personal life
Lucia was born in Philadelphia, Pennsylvania. His family moved to Poway, California when Lucia was ten years old. He went to Palomar College on a football scholarship and earned a teaching degree. Before becoming a financial advisor, Lucia was a high school teacher and football coach, and also played guitar and sang in a rock band. Lucia and his wife have four children.

Financial advisor
Lucia founded the Raymond J. Lucia Companies, Inc. and was the company's president and CEO for over twenty years. Registered Rep Magazine named Lucia as one of the "Top 100 Independent Financial Advisors in America" in 2008, and he was one of ten financial advisors recognized in the magazine's 2004 "Outstanding Broker Awards."

On September 5, 2012, the SEC alleged that Ray Lucia spread misleading information about his Buckets of Money strategy at a series of investment seminars. Lucia had assured investors that his strategies had been backtested during bear markets. The SEC contended that the only backtesting Lucia performed were some "calculations made in the late 1990s and two two-page spreadsheets."

On July 9, 2013, an administrative judge ordered Lucia to pay $50,000, finding that Lucia's claims that his strategy had been empirically backtested were false. The administrative judge barred Lucia from associating with any investment advisor or broker, stripped Raymond J. Lucia Companies Inc. of its investment adviser registration, and fined the company . Lucia appealed the decision, arguing that the administrative judge position within the SEC was an officer of the United States which required appointment to the position, and argued that the SEC's current judge was not properly appointed. The SEC and the District Court rejected Lucia's argument, leading him to petition to the United States Supreme Court by mid-2017. The Court heard the case as Lucia v. SEC, and in June 2018, ruled in favor of Lucia's position that such administrative judges are officers and must be hired appropriated. They reversed the previous judgments and granted Lucia a new hearing within the SEC under an appropriately-appointed administrative judge.

As of 1/3/2015, Ray Lucia Senior's FINRA Broker Check record details 21 Customer Disputes, 8 of which are still pending as of 1/3/15.  Five of these are from 2012, Six 2013 and Eight from 2014.  Ten of the Eleven “Settled” Claims and Seven of the Eight “Pending” Claims are for “Real Estate Securities.”

Writing
Lucia is author of three books focusing on retirement investment strategies, with co-author Dale Fetherling:
 The Buckets of Money Retirement Solution: The Ultimate Guide to Income for Life (2010) (foreword by Ben Stein)
 Ready... Set... Retire! Financial Strategies for the Rest of Your Life (2007)
 Buckets of Money: How To Retire in Comfort and Safety (2004)

Radio and television
In 1990, The Ray Lucia Show began airing on radio station KFMB (AM) in San Diego. From 2000 to 2011, the show was nationally syndicated on the Business Talk Radio Network. Currently it can be heard on the Global American Broadcasting Network In 2009, Talkers Magazine named Lucia as one of the "100 Most Important Radio Talk Show Hosts in America." Lucia is also a frequent guest on the Sean Hannity Show. In September 2010 The Ray Lucia Show was picked up for television by the Biz Television Network. In addition to his own show, Lucia has appeared on ABC's Good Morning America, Fox News Channel's Your World With Neil Cavuto and The Cost of Freedom and CNBC's On The Money. Lucia announced in June 2019 that he is retiring from broadcasting. His June 28 program will be his last.

References

External links 
 Raymond J. Lucia, Sr., CFP. RJL Wealth Management

Living people
American financial businesspeople
American finance and investment writers
American television talk show hosts
American talk radio hosts
Businesspeople from Philadelphia
1950 births
Palomar Comets football players
Radio personalities from Philadelphia